SS Esek Hopkins was a Liberty ship built in the United States during World War II. She was named after Esek Hopkins, the only Commander in Chief of the Continental Navy during the American Revolutionary War. He was also an accomplished merchant captain and privateer. He is noted for his successful raid on the British port of Providence, in the Bahamas, and capturing large stores of military supplies.

Construction
Esek Hopkins was laid down on 28 January 1942, under a Maritime Commission (MARCOM) contract, MCE hull 34, by the Bethlehem-Fairfield Shipyard, Baltimore, Maryland; and was launched on 27 April 1942.

History
She was allocated to Moore-McCormack Lines, Inc., on 23 May 1942. On 17 May 1948, she was laid up in the National Defense Reserve Fleet, Mobile, Alabama. On 27 April 1967, she was sold for scrapping to Union Minerals & Alloys Corp., for $45,501. She was withdrawn from the fleet on 13 May 1967.

References

Bibliography

 
 
 
 

 

Liberty ships
Ships built in Baltimore
1942 ships
Mobile Reserve Fleet